Grant City is an unincorporated community in Sac County, in the U.S. state of Iowa. The community is located one mile north of Auburn, at the junction of Xavier Avenue and Yankee Avenue.

History 
A post office was established at Grant City in 1862, and operated until 1912. Grant City's population was estimated at 250 in 1887, and was 95 in 1925.

References 

Unincorporated communities in Sac County, Iowa
Unincorporated communities in Iowa